The 1940 United States presidential election in Maine took place on November 5, 1940. All contemporary 48 states were part of the 1940 United States presidential election. State voters chose five electors to the Electoral College, which selected the president and vice president.

Maine was won by Republican businessman Wendell Willkie of New York, who was running against incumbent Democratic President Franklin D. Roosevelt of New York. Willkie ran with Senator Charles L. McNary of Oregon while Roosevelt ran with Henry A. Wallace of Iowa.

Willkie won Maine by a narrow margin of 2.33%, a swing of 11.66% to Roosevelt during an election where FDR lost 697 counties that had supported him four years earlier, mostly because of German American opposition to increasing "tension" with Nazi dictator Adolf Hitler. Contrariwise, the powerful "Anglophile" tendencies of Yankee and French-Canadian Maine meant that support for aid to the United Kingdom and France in ongoing World War II turned substantial numbers of normally rock-ribbed GOP voters to Roosevelt. This was the first time Kennebec County had ever voted for a Democratic presidential candidate.

Results

Results by county

See also
 United States presidential elections in Maine

References

Maine
1940
1940 Maine elections